PM Entertainment Group Inc. was an American independent production, distribution company which produced a distinctive line of low-to-medium budget films mostly targeted for home-video market. The company diversified into television production and larger budgeted star vehicles before being sold by its founders in 2000.

History

City Lights Entertainment (1986–1990)
In 1986, Joseph Toufik Merhi and Richard Joseph Pepin, indie film directors and producers, founded the production company City Lights Entertainment with Ronald L. Gilchrist for their first movies, the comedy Hollywood In Trouble and slasher film Mayhem. The films were successful and caught the VHS Direct-to-video boom beginning in the mid-late 80s.

However, in 1989, the relationship between Pepin/ Merhi and Gilchrist turned sour and their partnership was dissolved with Gilchrist and City Lights keeping the rights to the films already produced or in production. The last films released by City Lights were Payback and Contra Conspiracy in 1990. City Lights Entertainment produced eleven films from 1986 to 1990.

PM Entertainment Group Inc. (1989–2000)
Around 1989, after splitting from Ronald Gilchrist, Richard (Rick) Pepin and Joseph Merhi started PM Entertainment (PM Entertainment from surnames Pepin-Merhi). Based on the successful formula pioneered at City Lights Entertainment, PM Entertainment entered into an exclusive distribution contract with HBO and George Shamieh joined as the third partner and head of sales. The first film produced by PM Entertainment was L.A. Heat directed by Merhi and starring Lawrence Hilton-Jacobs and Jim Brown. The film was quickly followed by two sequels, L.A. Vice (1989) and Chance (1990) with Lawrence Hilton-Jacobs reprising his role as Jon Chance. He also directed Angels of the City in 1989 and cameos as Jon Chance, but the film's plot is not a sequel to L.A. Heat.

The company began bringing together a company of actors and directors to work over multiple projects, including Wings Hauser, who directed and starred in three films for the company in the early 90s, and Jeff Conaway, who starred in three films and directed Bikini Summer II.

Although the company focused primarily on the action market and exploitation films, they attempted to diversify into children's films (Magic Kid and Bigfoot: The Unforgettable Encounter) and dramas (Cellblock Sisters: Banished Behind Bars) with limited success. During the '90s, PM Entertainment had success within the kickboxing and martial arts genre and championed Cynthia Rothrock and Don "The Dragon" Wilson in multiple film projects.

In 1996, PM Entertainment diversified into television production with L.A. Heat (TV series). The tv series is largely unrelated their earlier film, L.A. Heat and neither Lawrence Hilton-Jacobs nor his character, Det. Jon Chance, appear in the show. Instead, it focuses on Chester "Chase" McDonald (Wolf Larson) and Detective August Brooks (Steven Williams), two Los Angeles police detectives investigating robbery/homicides. The series aired on TNT for two seasons beginning March 15, 1999.

A second tv series, Hollywood Safari, which acted as a continuation of PM Entertainment's 1997 film of the same name and starred Sam J. Jones and Ted Jan Roberts, ran for one season before its cancellation.

In 1997, PM Entertainment decided that they wanted to double its own facilities on Sun Valley, in order to move to a nearly 15-acre site.

The Harvey Entertainment Group. (2000–2002)
PM Entertainment's business model changed in the late '90s to accommodate distributors' requirement that films hire bankable names for projects and they began making films such as Inferno with Jean-Claude van Damme which greatly affected their profit margin. Joseph Merhi and Richard Pepin sold the company to The Harvey Entertainment Group in early 2000 $6.5 million in cash and a further $1.45 million in stock. George Shamieh remained as head of the company under the new owners. The company continued to produce star vehicles such as Layover with David Hasselhoff and Camouflage with Leslie Nielsen, however Shamieh departed the company in late 2000 due to financial restructuring of The Harvey Entertainment Group.

CineTel Films was brought in to market the library of PM Entertainment and sell rights for up coming productions Con Express and Tunnel with Daniel Baldwin. These would be the last films produced under the PM Entertainment banner. Facing liquidation, in 2001, The Harvey Entertainment Group sold off its assets, excluding PM Entertainment, to Classic Media, although PM Entertainment remains in the hands of Harvey chief Roger Burlage, which later placed the company up for sale, and two years later, the company sold PM Entertainment and its library of over 150 films and 2 TV series to Echo Bridge Entertainment, who also acquired the assets of CineTel Films.

Films

Television programs

References

External links
 2007 Audio Interview with Richard W. Munchkin about Joseph Merhi and PM Entertainment
 An oral history of PM Entertainment, a low-budget high-octane American dream

Mass media companies established in 1989
Companies disestablished in 2002
Film production companies of the United States
Defunct American film studios